The Romania women's youth national handball team is the national under–17 Handball team of Romania. Controlled by the Romanian Handball Federation it represents Romania in international matches.

Notable players

All-Star 
 Ionela Gâlcă-Stanca
 Florentina Grecu-Stanciu
 Alexandra Cătineanu
 Nicoleta Dincă
 Cristina Neagu
 Gabriela Perianu
 Bianca Bazaliu
 Cristina Laslo
 Lorena Ostase 
 Diana Ciucă
 Sorina Tîrcă

Notable coaches 
 Aurelian Roşca
 Gavril Kozma
 Mircea Anton

External links 
 

Handball in Romania
Women's national youth handball teams
Handball